The Ethiopian Super Cup (Amharic: የኢትዮጵያ አሸናፊዎች አሸናፊ ዋንጫ) is a match competition in Ethiopian football, played between the Ethiopian Premier League champions and the Ethiopian Cup winners.

Finals
1985 : Brewery (Addis Abeba)
1986 : Brewery (Addis Abeba)
1987 : Brewery (Addis Abeba)
1988 : Bunna Gebeya (Addis Abeba)
1989 : no competition
1990 : Brewery (Addis Abeba)
1991 : no competition
1992 : no competition
1993 : Mebrat Hail (Addis Abeba)
1994 : Saint-George SA (Addis Abeba)
1995 : Saint-George SA (Addis Abeba)
1996 : Saint-George SA (Addis Abeba)
1997 : Ethiopian Bunna (Addis Abeba)
1998 : Mebrat Hail (Addis Abeba)
1999 : no competition (St. George won double)
2000 : Ethiopian Bunna (Addis Abeba)  1-1 2-1 Saint-George SA (Addis Abeba)
2001 : Mebrat Hail (Addis Abeba) 4-1 1-2 Saint-George SA (Addis Abeba)
2002 : Saint-George SA (Addis Abeba) 2-1 1-0 Medhin (Addis Abeba)
2003 : Saint-George SA (Addis Abeba) 1-0 5-0 Ethiopian Bunna (Addis Abeba)   
2004 : Bankoch (Addis Abeba) 2-1 agg Awassa Kenema (Awassa)
2005 : Saint-George SA (Addis Abeba) 2-0 2-0 Awassa Kenema (Awassa)
2006 : Saint-George SA (Addis Abeba) 0-0 6-0 Mekelakeya (Addis Abeba)
2008 : Ethiopian Bunna (Addis Abeba) 2-1 awd Saint-George SA (Addis Abeba)
2009 : Saint-George SA (Addis Abeba) 3-2 Dedebit (Addis Abeba)
2010 : Ethiopian Bunna (Addis Abeba) 2-1 0-0 Saint-George SA (Addis Abeba)
2011 : unknown
2012 : unknown
2013 : unknown
2014 : unknown
2015 : Saint-George SA 1-1 (5-4 pen.) Mekelakeya (Addis Abeba)
2016 : unknown
2017 : Saint-George SA 2-0 Welayta Dicha (Sodo)
2018 : Mekelakeya (Addis Abeba) 1-1   (4-2 pen.) Jimma (Jimma)

2019 : Fasil Kenema (Gonder) 1-0 Mekelle 70 Enderta (Mekelle)

References

Ethiopian Coffee clinches Ethiopia Super Cup

External links
Ethiopia - List of Super Cup Winners, RSSSF.com

National association football supercups
SuperCup